Raoul Hynckes ( Brussels, 11 May 1893 - Blaricum, 19 January 1973 ) was a Dutch painter of Belgian origin.
The style of Hynckes was initially impressionistic, but in the thirties of the last century he began allegorical still lifes to paint in a very realistic manner and in an extremely fine and meticulous painting style (withered trees, old nails, skulls). He is counted among the magical realists . Regularly he also worked as bookbinding designer and poster designer.
Hynckes gained further fame through his autobiographical writings "Friends of Midnight", appeared in the series Private Domain.

External links
Biography plus some paintings (in Dutch)

1893 births
1973 deaths
Dutch painters
Dutch male painters
Magic realist artists
Artists from Brussels
20th-century Belgian painters
Belgian emigrants to the Netherlands